Kjell Lynau (22 March 1922 – 21 July 1983) is a Norwegian editor.

He started as a journalist in Nordstrands Blad and Akersposten from 1941 to 1944, then the Norwegian News Agency from 1945 to 1952. He was hired as a subeditor in Billedbladet Nå in 1952 and was the magazine's editor from 1954 to 1983. He also chaired the Periodical Press Association from 1955 to 1960.

References

1922 births
1983 deaths
Journalists from Oslo
Norwegian magazine editors